The Belaya (in its upper course Юрумкувеем Yurumkuveyem) is a south-flowing tributary of the Anadyr in the Chukotka Autonomous Okrug administrative region of Russia.

Course
The source of the Yurumkuveyem is in the northern Anadyr Mountains. Its main tributaries are the Bolshoy Pykarvaam, Chaavaam and Bolshaya Osinovaya from the left, and the Enmyvaam, which drains Lake Elgygytgyn, from the right. Downstream from its confluence with the Enmyvaam it is named Belaya.

The Belaya flows through sparsely populated areas of Chukotka, flows southwards across the eastern edge of the Anadyr Highlands and the Pekulney Range, and joins with the Enmyvaam in the Parapol-Belsky Lowlands, at the head of the Anadyr Lowlands. Ust-Belaya village lies at the confluence of the Belaya and Anadyr. Below the confluence with the Belaya, the Anadyr separates into multiple smaller channels upriver from where the Tanyurer meets it. The Belaya and its tributaries are frozen for about eight to nine months in a year.

Fauna
A type of whitefish, Coregonus cylindraceus, is common in the waters of the Belaya River.

See also
List of rivers of Russia

References

External links
  

Rivers of Chukotka Autonomous Okrug